The 1966 United States Senate election in Oklahoma took place on November 8, 1966. Democratic Senator Fred R. Harris ran for re-election to a second term, and his first full term. After winning an easy victory in the Republican primary, he faced attorney Pat J. Patterson, the Republican nominee, in the general election. Patterson wasn't viewed as a strong candidate against Harris, but the national Republican landslide helped make the race somewhat close. Harris ended up narrowly defeating Patterson to win his final term in the Senate.

Democratic primary

Candidates
 J. Howard Edmondson, incumbent U.S. Senator, former Governor of Oklahoma
 Fred R. Harris, State Senator
 Raymond D. Gary, former Governor of Oklahoma

Results

Republican primary

Candidates
 Pat J. Patterson, Oklahoma City attorney
 Don Kinkaid, Oklahoma City oilman
 Gustav K. Brandborg, former radio station manager

Results

Runoff election results

General election

Results

References

1966
Oklahoma
United States Senate